The McClurg Building is a historic building located at 245 Main St. in Racine, Wisconsin. The building was built in 1858 and designed by Alexander McClurg in the Renaissance architecture and Italianate architecture styles.

The building originally held offices for the Racine and Mississippi Railroad and has served a variety of other uses since its construction. Many of the businesses and institutions which occupied the building were the first of their kind in Racine, including the city's first public library, municipal court, vaudeville theater, movie theater, and Turkish bath, as well as the United States' first vocational school. The building was added to the National Register of Historic Places on July 13, 1977.

References

Commercial buildings on the National Register of Historic Places in Wisconsin
Renaissance Revival architecture in Wisconsin
Office buildings completed in 1858
Buildings and structures in Racine, Wisconsin
National Register of Historic Places in Racine County, Wisconsin